The Jāmeh Mosque of Ardestan ( – Masjid-e-Jāmeh Ardestan) is a congregational mosque (Jāmeh) in Ardestan, in the province of  Isfahan, Iran. It ranks as No. 180 in the Inventory of National Artefacts of Iran. 
The oldest parts indicate a pre-Seljuk building, and it is possible the mosque was built on the site of a Chahartaq. The structure was incorporated in a Seljuk kiosk mosque in the 12th century, and further expanded to the classical four-iwan plan. The stucco decoration of the mihrab was altered during the Il-Khanid period.

Gallery

References

External links

12th-century mosques
Mosques in Iran
Buildings and structures in Isfahan Province
Mosque buildings with domes
National works of Iran